"The Git Up" is a song by American artist Blanco Brown, released as his debut single on May 3, 2019. It has been described as the "sequel" to Lil Nas X's "Old Town Road" and the "next viral country rap song". Brown filmed himself performing a line dance to the song, which became a meme and was later used in its music video. It debuted at number 66 on the US Billboard Hot 100 and peaked at number 14. "The Git Up" serves as the lead single from Brown's debut album Honeysuckle & Lightning Bugs. A remix featuring singer Ciara was released on December 23, 2019, containing an altered, "booming" beat.

Background

Brown described the initial version of the track as similar to "Achy Breaky Heart" (which Billy Ray Cyrus featured in the remix of "Old Town Road"), influencing the dance element as he felt "You couldn't take the song serious, but then you can't make the song a joke either, because it was a smash." The release of the similar "Old Town Road" had a direct effect on the release of the song, as initially it "was supposed to be like a filler" from his EP. However, after learning of "Old Town Road", Brown called his label's vice president telling him they needed to release the song.

Commercial performance
The song reached number one on the Hot Country Songs chart on its fifth week on the chart. The song was certified Gold on September 4, 2019, and Platinum on October 4, 2019. The song has sold 475,000 copies in the United States as of March 2020.

Remix
An official remix was released on December 23, 2019, featuring R&B singer Ciara, a longtime friend of Brown's. The remix has a new beat, with "more booming, extra percussion and hand claps". Brown and Ciara perform the bridge together. Ciara references her previous song, "1, 2 Step", singing: "Let me see you two step, then one, two step".

Charts

Weekly charts

Year-end charts

Certifications

References

2019 debut singles
2019 songs
Line dances
Blanco Brown songs
BBR Music Group singles